Bulbophyllum minax is a species of orchid in the genus Bulbophyllum. It is critically endangered due to deforestation.

References
The Bulbophyllum-Checklist
The Internet Orchid Species Photo Encyclopedia

Notes

minax